Eleazar David David (June 8, 1811 – February 1, 1887) was a Canadian cavalry officer, lawyer, and civil servant. He was the son of Samuel David, and grandson of Aaron Hart.

References

1811 births
1887 deaths
Canadian Jews
People from Montreal
Canadian lawyers
People of pre-Confederation Canada
19th-century Canadian civil servants
Canadian Militia officers
Canadian people of English-Jewish descent
Canadian people of German-Jewish descent
19th-century Canadian Jews